Télé-Philatélie, was a 30-minute French television program devoted to philately and broadcast from 1961 to 1983.

Jacqueline Caurat presented the show with Lucien Berthelot and produced it.

References

1961 French television series debuts
1983 French television series endings
1950s French television series
French-language television shows
Philately of France
TF1 original programming